Krông Bông is a district of Vietnam's Đắk Lắk province. The name is originally from the language of an ethnic group in the Central Highlands.

Administration
The chief town of Krông Bông is Krông Kmar. There are 13 communities: Hòa Sơn, Hòa Lễ, Hòa Phong, Hòa Thành, Hòa Tân, Cư Kty, Yang Réh, Ea Trul, Yang Mao, Yang Kang, Cư Drăm, Cư Pui and Khuê Ngọc Điền.

Geography
A high percentage of the area is covered by tropical forest, therefore, Krông Bông's climate is relatively cool and pleasant. The average temperature is about 25 degrees Celsius.

In addition, Krông Bông has one of the largest national parks of Vietnam, Chư Yang Sin National Park, which is named after the highest mountain in Đắk Lắk province.

Krông Kmar, the main town of Krông Bông, is a small town in a valley surrounded by the Chư Yang Sin mountain system.

Economy

Unlike many other districts of Đắk Lắk, coffee is not the main crop due to Krông Bông's environmental conditions, such as the lack of red basaltic soil. Cashew, cassava and pepper are the most important agricultural products.

A large power plant has been built at Krông Kmar Waterfall—one of the most beautiful waterfalls in Đắk Lắk—to supply electricity for the entire surrounding area.

As of 2003, the district had a population of 82,530. The district covers an area of 1,250 km2. The district capital lies at Krông Kmar.

References

External links
Official website : https://web.archive.org/web/20160111034150/http://krongbong.org/

Districts of Đắk Lắk province